Phum Thmei is a khum (commune) of Thma Puok District in Banteay Meanchey Province in north-western Cambodia.

Villages

 Kab Chaor(កាប់ចោរ)
 Kouk Svay(គោកស្វាយ)
 Rumlum Chrey(រំលំជ្រៃ)
 Thmei Lech(ថ្មីលិច)
 Thmei Kandal(ថ្មីកណ្ដាល)
 Thmei Khang Tbong(ថ្មីខាងត្បូង)
 Totea(ទទេ)

References

Communes of Banteay Meanchey province
Thma Puok District